Paipa cheese is a semi-hard, semi-fat, and semi-aged cheese produced solely in the Valley of Sogamoso, which includes the towns of Paipa and Sotaquirá, due to its protected denomination of origin status granted by the Colombian government.

See also
 List of cheeses

References

External links 

 Diversity of the fungal microbiote of the Paipa cheese manufactured in Pacho, Cundinamarca, by Alfredo López Molinello, Food Engineering Research Group. University of La Salle. Bogota Colombia. Rev. ion vol.24 no.1 Bucaramanga Jan./June 2011
 Recetas con Queso Paipa Campo Real. https://camporeal.co/Recetar%C3%ADo_Digital.pdf

Colombian cuisine
Cow's-milk cheeses